The BNXT League Rising Star of the Year award is given annually at the end of the regular season of the BNXT League, the highest professional basketball league in Belgium and the Netherlands. This award is given to two young upcoming basketball talents in the BNXT League. One Belgian and one Dutch player has been awarded. To be eligible, players must be under 23 years old.

The current award, given by the BNXT League, began when that league started, with the 2021–22 season.

BNXT League Player of the Year winners (2022–present)

Player nationalities by national team:

References

External links
BNXT League - Official Site
BNXT League - Official Award Page
BNXT League at Eurobasket.com

European basketball awards
BNXT League basketball awards